Ventricose is an adjective describing the condition of a mushroom, gastropod or plant that it is "swollen, distended, or inflated especially on one side".

Mycology
In mycology, ventricose is a condition in which the cystidia, lamella or stipe of a mushroom is swollen in the middle.

Gastropods
In gastropods, if the shell of a snail is ventricose or subventricose, it means the whorl of the shell is swollen.

References

Mycology
Fungal morphology and anatomy